The 1995 Tour de France was the 82nd edition of Tour de France, one of cycling's Grand Tours. The Tour began in Saint-Brieuc with a prologue individual time trial on 1 July and Stage 10 occurred on 12 July with a mountainous stage to Alpe d'Huez. The race finished on the Champs-Élysées in Paris on 23 July.

Prologue
1 July 1995 — Saint-Brieuc,  (individual time trial)

Stage 1
2 July 1995 — Dinan to Lannion,

Stage 2
3 July 1995 — Perros-Guirec to Vitré,

Stage 3
4 July 1995 — Mayenne to Alençon,  (TTT)

Stage 4
5 July 1995 — Alençon to Le Havre,

Stage 5
6 July 1995 — Fécamp to Dunkirk,

Stage 6
7 July 1995 — Dunkirk to Charleroi (Belgium),

Stage 7
8 July 1995 — Charleroi (Belgium) to Liège (Belgium),

Stage 8
9 July 1995 — Huy (Belgium) to Seraing (Belgium),  (ITT)

Stage 9
11 July 1995 — Le Grand-Bornand to La Plagne,

Stage 10
12 July 1995 — La Plagne to Alpe d'Huez,

References

1995 Tour de France
Tour de France stages